A total solar eclipse occurred on June 16, 1806. A solar eclipse occurs when the Moon passes between Earth and the Sun, thereby totally or partly obscuring the image of the Sun for a viewer on Earth. A total solar eclipse occurs when the Moon's apparent diameter is larger than the Sun's, blocking all direct sunlight, turning day into darkness. Totality occurs in a narrow path across Earth's surface, with the partial solar eclipse visible over a surrounding region thousands of kilometres wide.
Totality was visible in a diagonal path across the United States, and ended in North Africa.

Observations

It has been called Tecumseh's Eclipse after the Shawnee chief, Tecumseh. He realized that the only hope for the various tribes in east and central North America was to join together. He was assisted by his brother, Tenskwatawa, called The Prophet, who called for a rejection of European influence and a return to traditional values. This tribal unity threatened William Henry Harrison, the Territorial Governor of Indiana and future 9th President of the United States. Harrison tried to discredit the Shawnee leader by challenging Tenskwatawa to prove his powers. He wrote: "If he (Tenskwatawa) is really a prophet, ask him to cause the Sun to stand still or the Moon to alter its course, the rivers to cease to flow or the dead to rise from their graves."

Tenskwatawa declared that the Great Spirit was angry at Harrison and would give a sign. "Fifty days from this day there will be no cloud in the sky. Yet, when the Sun has reached its highest point, at that moment will the Great Spirit take it into her hand and hide it from us. The darkness of night will thereupon cover us and the stars will shine round about us. The birds will roost and the night creatures will awaken and stir." On that day, there was an eclipse, and Harrison's attempt to divide the Shawnee people backfired spectacularly. Then Tecumseh ordered the Great Spirit to release the sun.

José Joaquín de Ferrer observed from Kinderhook, New York and gave the name corona to the glow of the faint outer atmosphere of the Sun seen during a total eclipse. He proposed that the corona must belong to the Sun, not the Moon, because of its great size. Ferrer also stated that during the total eclipse of 1806, the irregularities of the moon's surface were plainly discernible.

Capel Lofft observed from the United Kingdom of Great Britain and Ireland.

Related eclipses 
It is a part of solar Saros 124.

Notes

References

 NASA chart graphics
 Googlemap
 NASA Besselian elements
 
 Tecumseh and the Eclipse of 1806
 

1806 6 16
1806 in science
1806 6 16
June 1806 events